Battle box can refer to:

 The Battle Box, a command centre in Singapore used in World War II's Malayan Campaign.
 Battle box, a term used in some collectible card games for a set of cards intended to help new players get started; essentially a larger booster pack.